The 1944 Millsaps Majors football team was an American football team that represented Millsaps College as an independent during the 1944 college football season. In their 1st year under head coach Benjamin O. Van Hook, the team compiled a 1–5 record.

Schedule

References

Millsaps
Millsaps Majors football seasons
Millsaps Majors football